= 2010 World Freestyle Skating Championships =

- Location: Jeonju, South Korea
- Start date: September 7, 2010
- End date: September 9, 2010

The 4th World Freestyle Skating Championships were held in Jeonju, South Korea from September 7 to September 9, 2010.

== Medallists ==
Event	Gold	Silver	Bronze
Speed slalom
Junior Men	China (CHN); Lan Wang Heng	Chinese Taipei (TPE); Yang Hsin Chiao	France (FRA); Alexandre Claris
Junior Women	France (FRA); Clémence Guicheteau	Chinese Taipei (TPE); Wang Tzu-Chien	China (CHN); Deng Ling
Senior Men	France (FRA); Yohan Fort	China (CHN); Guo Fang	South Korea (KOR); Kim Sung Jin
Senior Women	Italy (ITA); Barbara Bossi	Italy (ITA); Chloé Seyrès	Italy (ITA); Christina Rotunno
Pair freestyle
	South Korea (KOR); Kim Sung Jin and Kim Tae Bin	South Korea (KOR); Lee Choong Goon and Do Ji Hwan	Chinese Taipei (TPE); Wang Shih Yu and Wang Shen Wen
Freestyle Slalom « Classic »
Junior Men	China (CHN)	China (CHN)	Chinese Taipei (TPE)
Junior Women	China (CHN)	China (CHN)	Russia (RUS)
Senior Men	China (CHN); Pu HaoYang	South Korea (KOR); Kim Sung Jin	China (CHN); Guo Fang
Senior Women	China (CHN); Chen Chen	France (FRA); Chloé Seyres	Ukraine (UKR); Marina Boyko
Freestyle Slalom « Battle »
Men	China (CHN); Pu HaoYang	South Korea (KOR); Kim Sung Jin	China (CHN); Guo Fang
Women	Ukraine (UKR); Marina Boyko	Russia (RUS); Polina Semenova	China (CHN); Chen Chen
